The Last Act of Martin Weston is a Canadian-Czech drama film, directed by Michael Jacot and released in 1970. The film stars Jon Granik as Martin Weston, an American businessman working in Prague who is dissatisfied with his life and planning his suicide.

The cast also includes Nuala Fitzgerald, Milena Dvorská and Al Waxman.

The film had originally been planned to be set and shot in Canada; however, after Jacot failed to secure funding from the Canadian Film Development Corporation, he instead reached a deal with the Czech production firm Barrandov Studios to shoot the film in Prague.

The film premiered in competition at the 22nd Canadian Film Awards. It was also later screened at the 1971 Cannes Film Festival as part of Cinema Canada, a non-competitive lineup of Canadian films.

References

External links

1970 films
1970 drama films
Canadian drama films
Czech drama films
Canadian independent films
Czech independent films
Films shot in Prague
Films set in Prague
English-language Canadian films
1970s Canadian films